Sally Paul (born 1937) is a former Guernsey international lawn bowler.

Bowls career
Paul has represented Guernsey at the Commonwealth Games, in the fours at the 1994 Commonwealth Games.

In 1993, she won the triples bronze medal (with Eunice Thompson and Jean Simon) at the Atlantic Bowls Championships in Florida.

References

Living people
Guernsey female bowls players
Bowls players at the 1994 Commonwealth Games
1937 births